The 1926 season was the Chicago Bears' 7th in the National Football League. The team was able to improve on their 9–5–3 record from 1925 and finished with a 12–1–3 record under head coach George Halas earning them a second-place finish in the team standings, their fifth showing in that place in the last seven years. This year's Bears may have been the most talented to date, with most of their veterans still playing well and the addition of talented veteran Paddy Driscoll and hard-running rookie William Senn. The Bears opened their season with 13 undefeated games (11 wins and 2 ties). Since ties didn't count in the standings at that time, the Bears were in first place since their main competition, the Frankford Yellow Jackets, had lost an earlier game to the Providence Steam Roller. The showdown came on December 4 at Frankford. Neither team scored for the first three-quarters of this game; the tie was broken when Senn burst through the Frankford line for a 62-yard touchdown run. Driscoll missed the PAT, leaving Frankford a chance. Frankford proceeded to complete two long passes, the second for a score. Their kicker, Ernest Hamer, made the point after and Frankford won the game. Due to more victories, Frankford was the champion. The Bears were second yet again.

Driscoll was easily Chicago's best player in 1926, scoring 5 TDs, kicking 11 field goals, and converting 14 PATs. Senn scored 7 rushing touchdowns and Frank Hanny had 4 touchdown catches to lead the Bears.

Future Hall of Fame players
Paddy Driscoll, back (from Cardinals)
George Halas, end
Ed Healey, tackle
Link Lyman, tackle (from Frankford)
George Trafton, center

Other leading players
William Senn, back (rookie from Knox College)
Ed Sternaman, back
Joe Sternaman, quarterback 
Laurie Walquist, quarterback

Players departed from 1925
Hunk Anderson, guard (retired)
Red Grange, back (to New York Yankees of new American Football League)

Schedule

Standings

References
Pro Football Archives: 1926 Chicago Bears season

Chicago Bears
Chicago Bears seasons
Chicago Bears